Estádio de Militar Huíla is a multi-use stadium in Huila, Angola.  It is currently used mostly for football matches and is the home stadium of Clube Desportivo da Huíla.  The stadium holds 2,000 people.

See also
Football in Angola
List of football clubs in Angola

References

Huila